The name Dodong has been used in the Philippines by PAGASA in the Western Pacific.
 Severe Tropical Storm Nangka (2003) (T0305, 06W, Dodong) – approached Taiwan.
 Tropical Storm Wutip (2007) (T0707, 08W, Dodong) – approached Taiwan.
 Tropical Storm Sarika (2011) (T1103, 05W, Dodong) – struck China.
 Typhoon Noul (2015) (T1506, 06W, Dodong) – a Category 5 typhoon that affected the Philippines in May of 2015.
 Tropical Storm Sepat (2019) (T1903, Dodong) – affected Japan and was not recognized by the JTWC.

Pacific typhoon set index articles